This list is of the Cultural Properties of Japan designated in the category of  for the Prefecture of Okinawa.

National Cultural Properties
As of 1 September 2017, twenty-three Important Cultural Properties with forty-one component structures have been designated, being of national significance.

Prefectural Cultural Properties
As of 31 July 2017, eighteen properties  have been designated at a prefectural level.

Municipal Cultural Properties
As of 1 May 2016, thirty-five properties have been designated at a municipal level.

Registered Cultural Properties
As of 1 September 2017, eighty-two properties at thirty-four sites have been registered (as opposed to designated) at a national level.

See also
 Cultural Properties of Japan
 National Treasures of Japan
 List of Historic Sites of Japan (Okinawa)
 Ryūkyū Kingdom
 Hague Convention for the Protection of Cultural Property in the Event of Armed Conflict

References

External links
  Cultural Properties in Okinawa Prefecture
  List of Cultural Properties in Okinawa Prefecture

Cultural Properties,Okinawa
Buildings and structures in Okinawa Prefecture
Okinawa
Structures,Okinawa